The Faces of Love is a 1924 Italian silent film directed by Carmine Gallone and starring Angelo Ferrari. It is based on the life of 18th-century French actress Adrienne Lecouvreur, whose life had been adapted into a play.

Cast
In alphabetical order
 Alex Bernard 
 Gina Cinquini 
 Angelo Ferrari
 Soava Gallone 
 Bonaventura Ibáñez 
 Lydianne 
 Alfredo Martinelli 
 Pietro Paoli 
 Giuseppe Pierozzi 
 Clarette Sabatelli

References

Bibliography
 P. D'Agostini & S. Della Casa. Cinema Italiano. Il Castoro, 1997.

External links

1924 films
Italian historical films
Italian biographical films
1920s Italian-language films
Films set in the 18th century
Films directed by Carmine Gallone
Italian silent feature films
Italian films based on plays
Films based on works by Eugène Scribe
Italian black-and-white films
Cultural depictions of Adrienne Lecouvreur
1920s Italian films